James Kwast (23 November 185231 October 1927) was a Dutch-German pianist and renowned teacher of many other notable pianists.  He was also a minor composer and editor.

Biography
Jacob James Kwast was born in Nijkerk, Netherlands, in 1852.  After studies with his father and Ferdinand Böhme in his home country, he became a student of Carl Reinecke at the Leipzig Conservatory, and had later studies in Berlin under Theodor Kullak, and Brussels under Louis Brassin and François-Auguste Gevaert.   He settled in Germany in 1883, initially as a teacher at the Cologne Conservatory, and later at the Hoch Conservatory in Frankfurt and the Klindworth-Scharwenka (1903–06) and Stern conservatories in Berlin. His students included Else Schmitz-Gohr.

He participated in the first performance in England of Brahms’s Piano Trio in C minor, with Carl Fuchs and Carl Deichmann.

Clara Schumann played her last public concert in Frankfurt on 12 March 1891. The last work she played was Brahms's Variations on a Theme by Haydn, in the piano-duet version, with Kwast as her partner.

He died in Berlin in 1927, aged 74.

Teacher
His reputation as a teacher reached far and wide.  The list of his students includes: 
 Walter Braunfels (whom he introduced to the music of Hans Pfitzner)
 Carl Friedberg
 Ilse Fromm-Michaels
 Percy Grainger
 Otto Klemperer (who studied under Kwast at three institutions and credited him with the whole basis of his music development)
 Ethel Leginska
 Walter Burle Marx 
 Hans Pfitzner (his future son-in-law)
 Edith Weiss-Mann
 Hermann Zilcher

Compositions
He wrote a piano concerto and various piano pieces, as well as piano transcriptions of Bach organ works.  He edited the keyboard works of Joseph Haydn.

Personal life
His first wife was Antonie (“Tony”), the daughter of Ferdinand Hiller. Their daughter Mimi Kwast married his pupil, the composer Hans Pfitzner.

He later married a pupil of his, Frieda Hodapp, who was a successful pianist.  She was the dedicatee of Max Reger's F minor Concerto, which she premiered in 1910, and the soloist in the first Berlin performance of Busoni's Concertino, BV 292. She also premiered Reger's Variations and Fugue on a Theme of Telemann, Op. 134, on 14 March 1915 at the Leipzig Gewandhaus.  The work was dedicated to her husband.

His brother was the conductor Jan Albert Kwast (Quast).

References

Sources
 Grove's Dictionary of Music and Musicians, 5th ed (1954), ed. Eric Blom, Vol IV, p. 880

1852 births
1927 deaths
Dutch classical pianists
Dutch music educators
Dutch composers
German classical pianists
Male classical pianists
German music educators
German composers
Piano pedagogues
People from Nijkerk
Academic staff of the Hochschule für Musik und Tanz Köln
19th-century classical pianists
19th-century German musicians
19th-century Dutch male musicians